John Croom (born August 22, 1993 in El Paso, Texas) is an American cyclist who races road and track cycling events. Croom moved to Rock Hill, South Carolina in 1999 with his family. He started cycling in 2012 after growing up with a football and wrestling background. John Croom is 6'2 and 198lbs (90kg).

Major Results

2021
National Track Championships

 Madison
 4km
 Omnium
 Team Pursuit
 Elimination Race
 Scratch Race

2019
USA National Team Pursuit Record 3:52.747

Pan American Championships 
 Team Pursuit
Pan American Games 
 Team Pursuit
National Track Championships
 1km
 4km Pursuit
 Team Pursuit
2018
National Track Championships
 1km
 4km Pursuit
 Team Pursuit
2017
National Track Championships
 1km
 Team Pursuit

References

External links
 
 
 

1993 births
Living people
American male cyclists
People from Rock Hill, South Carolina
Cyclists at the 2019 Pan American Games
Pan American Games medalists in cycling
Pan American Games gold medalists for the United States
Medalists at the 2019 Pan American Games
21st-century American people